Solifluction is a collective name for gradual processes in which a mass moves down a slope ("mass wasting") related to freeze-thaw activity. This is the standard modern meaning of solifluction, which differs from the original meaning given to it by Johan Gunnar Andersson in 1906.

Origin and evolution of the concept
In the original sense it meant the movement of waste saturated in water found in periglacial regions. However it was later discovered that various slow waste movements in periglacial regions did not require saturation in water, but were rather associated to freeze-thaw processes. The term solifluction was appropriated to refer to these slow processes, and therefore excludes rapid periglacial movements. In slow periglacial solifluction there are not clear gliding planes, and therefore skinflows and active layer detachments are not included in the concept. On the other hand, movement of waste saturated in water can occur in any humid climate, and therefore this kind of solifluction is not restricted to cold climates.

Slow periglacial solifluction is classified into four types:
 Ice creep
 Frost creep
 Gelifluction
 Plug-like flow
Slow solifluction acts much slower than some geochemical fluxes or than other erosion processes. The relatively low rates at which solifluction operates contrast with its occurrence over wide mountain areas and periglaciated lowlands. Since solifluction is associated with humidity and cold climates it can be used to infer past climates.

Deposits
Deposits of slow periglacial solifluction compromise poorly stratified diamicton and diamicton where stratification is wholly lacking. When stratification can be seen it is often distinguished by a buried organic soil. Some other solifluction deposits that have a more defined stratification consist of alternating layers of diamicton and open-work beds, these last representing buried stone-banked lobes and sheets. A common feature in solifluction deposits is the orientation of clasts parallel to the slope.

Landforms
Solifluction lobes and sheets are types of slope failure and landforms. In solifluction lobes sediments form a tongue-shaped feature due to differential downhill flow rates. In contrast, solifluction sheet sediments move more or less uniformly downslope, thus being a less selective form of erosion than solifluction lobes.

Extraterrestrial solifluction
It has been suggested that solifluction might be active on Mars, even relatively recently (within the last few million years), as observed Martian lobates bear many similarities with solifluction lobes known from Svalbard.

See also

 Mass wasting
 Stone run
 Frost weathering

External links
 An example of solifluction can be seen southeast of the Swedish lake Luspasjaure

Notes

Notes

References
 Anderson, J.G. 1906. "Solifluction, a Component of Subaërial Denudation", The Journal of Geology, Vol. 14, No. 2 (Feb. – Mar., 1906), pp. 91–112.
 French, H. M. 2007. The Periglacial Environment, Third Edition. John Wiley & Sons Ltd. 458 pp.
 Easterbrook, Don J. Surface Processes and Landforms. Upper Saddle River, NJ: Prentice Hall, 1999
 "Solifluction (geology)" Encyclopædia Britannica Online. n.d. Web. 10 Oct. 2013

Geological hazards
Soil erosion